Asmeron Habte (born 14 October 1983) is a German former professional footballer who played as a defender or midfielder.

Club career
Habte started his career with German second division side Eintracht Trier, where he made one league appearance. On 25 May 2003, he debuted for Eintracht Trier in a 1–0 loss to Union Berlin. After that, he signed for Victoria Rosport in Luxembourg, helping them qualify for the 2005 UEFA Intertoto Cup. After that, he signed for German seventh division club DJK St. Matthias Trier.

International career
Habte is eligible to represent Eritrea internationally.

References

External links
 Sammy Habte at playmakerstats.com

Living people
1983 births
German people of Eritrean descent
Sportspeople from Asmara
German footballers
Association football midfielders
Association football defenders
2. Bundesliga players
Luxembourg National Division players
SV Eintracht Trier 05 players
FC Victoria Rosport players
CS Grevenmacher players
German expatriate footballers
German expatriate sportspeople in Luxembourg
Expatriate footballers in Luxembourg